Blonde (French: Tête blonde) is a 1950 French comedy film directed by Maurice Cam and starring Jules Berry, Denise Grey and Marcel André.

The film's art direction was by Guy de Gastyne.

Cast
 Jules Berry as Frédéric Truche  
 Denise Grey as Isabelle Truche  
 Marcel André as L'inspecteur Paulot  
 Pauline Carton as La concierge de Claire  
 Jeanne Fusier-Gir as Mélanie 
 Marcelle Géniat as La grand-mère  
 Marcel Mouloudji as Bernard 
 Michèle Philippe as Claire Fontanier  
 Louis Seigner as Maître Canard  
 Jean Tissier as Le prisonnier 
 Jean Berton as L'agent  
 Campion 
 Raymond Cordy as Le brigadier  
 Claudine Céréda as Claudine  
 Yvonne Dany 
 Charles Dechamps as Le juge d'instruction  
 Jacques Denoël as Le journaliste  
 Fernand Gilbert as Le gardien de prison  
 Raymond Girard 
 René Génin as Le fossoyeur  
 Jim Gérald as Le médecin  
 Roger Krebs 
 Frédéric Mariotti as Le gardien  
 Maximilienne as Madame Rabichou  
 Georges Pally as Le chauffeur  
 Robert Pizani as Martin  
 Jean Pétavin 
 Tania Soucault 
 Jean Témerson as Le valet  
 François Vibert 
 Henri Vilbert as L'inspecteur Lambert

References

Bibliography 
 Philippe Rège. Encyclopedia of French Film Directors, Volume 1. Scarecrow Press, 2009.

External links 
 

1950 comedy films
French comedy films
1950 films
1950s French-language films
Films directed by Maurice Cam
French black-and-white films
1950s French films